Mound House can refer to:

 Mound House, an unincorporated town in Lyon County, Nevada, USA
 Mound House, an archeological site in Greene County, Illinois, USA
 Mound House, a site on the National Register of Historic Places in Duncan Falls, Ohio, USA
 Mound House in Fort Myers Beach, Florida